Alan William Shave, CVO, OBE (born 3 November 1936) is a retired British journalist and diplomat. He was Governor of Anguilla from 1992 to 1995.

References 
The Americas Review 1995. pp 113 & 114.
"Anguilla: Governor and Hughes at odds" (1994) Caribbean Insight,  vol 17, July 1994, p 5
"Anguilla" (1995) Caribbean Insight, vol 18, January 1995, p 4
"Anguilla" (1995) Caribbean Insight, vol 18, October 1995, p 5 
"Anguilla: MP's Appointment upheld by court" (1996) Caribbean Insight, vol 19, January 1996, p 4
"Anguilla: Opposition calls on Hughes to resign" (1997) Caribbean Insight, vol 20, October 1997, p 5
"New British Governor" (1995) 11 Caribbean Update 7
"Anguilla". South America, Central America and the Caribbean, 2000. 8th Edition. Europa Publications Limited. (Taylor & Francis Group). 1999.

1936 births
Commanders of the Royal Victorian Order
Officers of the Order of the British Empire
British journalists
20th-century British journalists
Civil servants in the Commonwealth Relations Office
Members of HM Diplomatic Service
20th-century Royal Air Force personnel
Governors of Anguilla
British expatriates in Bolivia
Living people